Feng Qiangbiao (born 20 March 1965) is a Chinese former swimmer who competed in the 1988 Summer Olympics.

References

1965 births
Living people
Chinese male freestyle swimmers
Olympic swimmers of China
Swimmers at the 1988 Summer Olympics
Asian Games medalists in swimming
Swimmers at the 1986 Asian Games
Swimmers at the 1990 Asian Games
Asian Games gold medalists for China
Asian Games bronze medalists for China
Medalists at the 1986 Asian Games
Medalists at the 1990 Asian Games
20th-century Chinese people